Miarinarivo is a city (commune urbaine) in Itasy Region, in the  Central Highlands of Madagascar.

Education 
In Miarinarivo are situated:
6 primary schools with  2000 pupils
4 secondary schools with 1400 pupils
4 Lycée with 900 students

Sports
The local soccer club CNaPS Sport had been several times Malagasy champions.

Religion
 FJKM - Fiangonan'i Jesoa Kristy eto Madagasikara (Church of Jesus Christ in Madagascar)
 FLM - Fiangonana Loterana Malagasy (Malagasy Lutheran Church)
 Roman Catholic Church (Cathedral of Christ the King)).

References

Cities in Madagascar
Populated places in Itasy Region
Regional capitals in Madagascar